Puabi (Akkadian: 𒅤𒀜 pu3-AD or Pu-abi "Word of my father"), also called Shubad or Shudi-Ad due to a misinterpretation by Sir Charles Leonard Woolley, was an important woman in the Sumerian city of Ur, during the First Dynasty of Ur (c. 2600 BCE). Commonly labeled as a "queen", her status is somewhat in dispute, although several cylinder seals in her tomb, labeled grave PG 800 at the Royal Cemetery at Ur, identify her by the title "nin" or "eresh", a Sumerian word denoting a queen or a priestess. Puabi's seal does not place her in relation to any king or husband, possibly indicating that she ruled in her own right. It has been suggested that she was the second wife of king Meskalamdug. The fact that Puabi, herself a Semitic Akkadian, was an important figure among Sumerians, indicates a high degree of cultural exchange and influence among the ancient Sumerians and their Semitic neighbors. Although little is known about Puabi's life, the discovery of Puabi's tomb and its death pit reveals important information as well as raises questions about Mesopotamian society and culture.

Tomb of Puabi
British archaeologist Leonard Woolley discovered the tomb of Puabi, which was excavated between 1922 and 1934 by a joint team sponsored by the British Museum and the University of Pennsylvania Museum of Archaeology and Anthropology. The Woolley team included his wife and fellow archaeologist, Katharine, who drew the detailed diagrams of the site. Puabi's tomb was found along with approximately 1,800 other graves at the Royal Cemetery at Ur. Puabi's tomb was clearly unique among the other excavations, not only because of the large number of high-quality and well-preserved grave goods, but also because her tomb had been untouched by looters through the millennia.

Objects in the Tomb 
The number of grave goods that Woolley uncovered in Puabi's tomb was staggering. They included a heavy, golden headdress made of golden leaves, rings and plates; a superb lyre (see Lyres of Ur) complete with a golden and lapis lazuli-encrusted bearded bull's head; a profusion of gold tableware; golden, carnelian, and lapis lazuli cylindrical beads used in extravagant necklaces and belts; a chariot adorned with lioness heads in silver, and an abundance of silver, lapis lazuli, and golden rings and bracelets, as well as her headdress, a belt made of gold rings, carnelian and lapis beads, and other various rings and earrings. Puabi's headdress drew inspiration from nature in its floral motifs and is made up of gold ribbons and leaves, lapis and carnelian beads, and gold flowers.

The "Death Pit" 
A number of "death pits" were also found outside of the chambers as well as above Puabi's chamber, raising questions about the initial attribution of the death pits to Puabi specifically. The largest and most well-known death pit held 74 attendants, 6 men, and 68 women, all adorned with various gold, silver, and lapis decoration, and one woman who appeared to be more elaborately adorned than the others. She was buried with 52 attendants: servants, guards, lions, a horse, a chariot, and several other bodies—retainers who were suspected by excavator Leonard Woolley to have poisoned themselves (or to have been poisoned by others) to serve their mistress in the next world. In Puabi's chamber, the remains of three other women were found, and these personal servants had minor adornments of their own. The pit found above Puabi's chamber contained 21 attendants, an elaborate harp or lyre, a chariot, and what was left of a large chest of personal grooming items. Due to the location of the pits and general lack of evidence, it is largely unclear whether the death pits may be directly linked to Puabi.

Theories of Cause of Death 
Evidence derived from CAT scans through the University of Pennsylvania Museum suggests that some of the sacrifices were likely violent and caused by blunt force trauma. A pointed, weighted tool could explain the shatter patterns on the skulls that resulted in death, while a small hammer-like tool was also found, retrieved, and catalogued by Woolley during his original excavation. The size and weight of the tool fit the damage sustained by the two bodies examined by Aubrey Baadsgaard, a Ph.D. candidate at the University of Pennsylvania. Cinnabar, or mercury vapour residue, was observed as well, and it would have been used to prevent or slow the decomposition of the bodies until the completion of the necessary funerary rites.

Remains
Puabi's physical remains, including pieces of the badly damaged skull, are kept in the Natural History Museum, London. The excavated finds from Woolley's expedition were divided among the British Museum in London, the University of Pennsylvania Museum in Philadelphia, Pennsylvania, and the National Museum in Baghdad. Several pieces of the treasure were looted from the National Museum in the aftermath of the Second Gulf War in 2003. Several of the more spectacular pieces from Puabi's grave were featured in a highly successful Art and History Museum tour through the United Kingdom and the United States.

Artefacts from tomb PG 800

References

Sources

External links
Queen Puabi (Penn Museum)
Plan of Queen Puabi's gravesite.
Royal Tombs of Ur at the University of Pennsylvania Museum
Jane Hickman: "Beauty Through the Ages" Jewelry: Worn to Adorn, lecture at the Penn Museum, published on Youtube 16 November 2011

26th-century BC Sumerian kings
26th-century BC women
Sumerian people
Akkadian people
Ancient Mesopotamian women
Ancient queens regnant
First Dynasty of Ur